David Matheson is a campaigner known for advocacy of conversion therapy. In 2019, he announced he was divorcing his wife of 34 years and intended to live as a gay man. He previously led the organization Journey into Manhood.

Matheson was an early protege of Joseph Nicolosi, who founded the National Association for Research & Therapy of Homosexuality (NARTH).

Matheson, a Mormon, said “he was not renouncing his religious faith, or the entirety of his work as a conversion therapist, despite dating men. But he did criticise the "shame-based, homophobic-based system" of his upbringing in the Mormon church.”

He and his wife had three children and one grandchild.

Career
Matheson has a master’s in counseling and guidance from Brigham Young University and began full-time practice in New Jersey in 2004.  He counseled only men and the goal was always to develop what he called “gender wholeness.”

Publications
Matheson, David (1993) "The Transition from Homosexuality: The Role of Evergreen International," Issues in Religion and Psychotherapy: Vol. 19 : No. 1 , Article 7.

References 

Conversion therapy practitioners
Living people
Brigham Young University alumni
Year of birth missing (living people)
People self-identified as ex-ex-gay